James McConnell (23 February 1899 – 1949) was a Scottish professional footballer born in Ayr who played as a centre forward in the English Football League for Carlisle United, Crewe Alexandra and Rotherham United.

McConnell began his football career following service during World War I. In June 1920, he played one game, scoring one goal, for Kilmarnock F.C. In February 1921, he joined Stevenston United F.C. In May 1921, his professional career began with Nithsdale Wanderers. In 1926, McConnell moved to the United States where he joined the Springfield Babes. He played only three games with Springfield before being sent to Providence. In August 1927, McConnell moved to Bethlehem Steel. He got off to a quick start, scoring seven goals in Bethlehem's first eight games of the season. When his production dried up, Bethlehem shipped him to J&P Coats. In 1928, McConnell moved to English side Carlisle United. He later played in England for Crewe Alexandra before retiring from football in 1934.

References

External links
 

1899 births
1949 deaths
Footballers from Ayr
Scottish footballers
Association football forwards
Kilmarnock F.C. players
Celtic F.C. players
American Soccer League (1921–1933) players
Springfield Babes players
Providence Clamdiggers players
Bethlehem Steel F.C. (1907–1930) players
J&P Coats players
Carlisle United F.C. players
Crewe Alexandra F.C. players
Rotherham United F.C. players
Place of death missing
Auchinleck Talbot F.C. players
Scottish expatriate footballers
Expatriate soccer players in the United States
Scottish expatriate sportspeople in the United States